The Deputy Prime Minister of Montenegro, officially Vice President of the Government of Montenegro (Montenegrin: Potpredsjednik Vlade Crne Gore), is the official Deputy of the Prime Minister of Montenegro.

Conventionally all of the junior partners in the coalition, get one deputy, they are ranked according to the size of their respective parties.

History of the office
The office of the Deputy Prime Minister of Montenegro was established on 15 February 1991, during the first government of Milo Đukanović. It was initially held by three people: Blagoje Lučić, Vuk Ognjenović and Zoran Žižić. Since then, the office was usually held simultaneously by several people at the same time (in the government of Filip Vujanović there were five Deputy Prime Ministers at one point). Also, Deputy Prime Ministers may or may not combine the position with another government portfolio. Deputy Prime Minister in the 42nd cabinet of Montenegro is Dritan Abazović.

List of deputy prime ministers

See also
Government of Montenegro

References

Government of Montenegro
Montenegro
Deputy Prime Ministers